George Beranger (27 March 1893 – 8 March 1973), also known as André Beranger, was an Australian silent film actor and director in Hollywood. He is also sometimes credited under the pseudonym George André de Beranger.

Early life
Beranger was born George Augustus Beringer in Enmore, New South Wales, Australia, the youngest of five sons of Caroline Mondientz and Adam Beringer, a German engine fitter. His mother committed suicide when he was three years old and he left home at the age of 14. He studied acting at the College of Elocution and Dramatic Art founded by Scottish actor Walter Bentley.

Career
Beranger began playing Shakespearean roles at the age of sixteen with the Walter Bentley Players. He then emigrated from Australia to California, United States in 1912 and worked in the silent film industry in Hollywood. According to a researcher, he "reinvented himself in Hollywood, claiming French parentage, birth on a French ocean liner off the coast of Australia and a Paris education." Beranger worked under the names George Alexandre Beranger and André de Beranger.

By the 1920s, Beranger had become a star, appearing in the movies of Ernst Lubitsch and D. W. Griffith. He also directed ten films between 1914 and 1924. Beranger owned a large Spanish-style home in Laguna Beach, rented a room at the Hollywood Athletic Club and owned an apartment in Paris, France.

Beranger eventually appeared in more than 140 films between 1913 and 1950. Beranger's career declined following the 1930s Great Depression and the advent of sound film, and his roles in later films were small and often uncredited. He supplemented his income as a draftsman for the Los Angeles City Council. He sold his large properties and moved into a modest cottage beside his house in Laguna Beach.

Beranger's silent roles had often been sophisticates or dandy types, and in early sound films he was often relegated to non-speaking walk-ons or bit parts as hairdressers, concierges, florists and the like. However, in the mid and late 1940s, he played interesting speaking bit parts in three 20th Century-Fox (his main studio) film noirs: The Spider (a B noir in which he has several lines as a nosy apartment manager), Nightmare Alley (an all-time classic noir, playing the geek in the first act and singing the Irish drinking song "The Boston Burglar") and Road House (for which he received a rare screen credit, in spite of having only two lines of dialogue as Richard Widmark's bespectacled fishing buddy, "Lefty").

Beranger entered into a "lavender marriage" with a neighbouring woman who was a widow, but they never shared the same house and he continued to have sexual relationships with men unabated.

Beranger retired in 1952 and lived his later years in seclusion. He was found dead of natural causes in his home on 8 March 1973.

Selected filmography

 The Well (1913 short) as The Accomplice
 The Switch Tower (1913 short) as A Tramp
 When Love Forgives (1913 short) as The Bartender
 Almost a Wild Man (1913)
 Home, Sweet Home (1914) as The Accordion Player
 The Birth of a Nation (1915) as Wade Cameron – Second Son
 The Absentee (1915) as Tom Burke / Ambition
 Let Katie Do It (1916) as Witness to Accident (uncredited)
 The Good Bad-Man (1916) as Thomas Stuart
 Flirting with Fate (1916) as Automatic Joe
 The Half-Breed (1916) as Jack Brace
 Pillars of Society (1916) as Johan Tonnesen
 Intolerance (1916) as Second Priest of Bel (uncredited)
 Manhattan Madness (1916) as The Butler
 Mixed Blood (1916) as Carlos
 Those Without Sin (1917) as Chester Wallace
 A Love Sublime (1917) as Her Husband
 A Daughter of the Poor (1917) as Rudolph Creig
 Time Locks and Diamonds (1917) as Ramon Mendoza
 The Spotted Lily (1917) as Captain Franz
 Sandy (1918) as Carter Nelson
 Broken Blossoms (1919) as The Spying One
 A Manhattan Knight (1920, director)
 Burn 'Em Up Barnes (1921, director)
 Sinister Street (1922, director)
 Was She Guilty? (1922, director)
 The Leopardess (1923) as Pepe
 The Man Life Passed By (1923)
 The Bright Shawl (1923) as Andre Escobar
 Ashes of Vengeance (1923) as Charles IX
 Dulcy (1923) as Vincent Leach
 The Extra Girl (1923) as Actor in Wardrobe Line
 Tiger Rose (1923) as Pierre
 The Man Life Passed By (1923) as Leo Friend
 Poisoned Paradise: The Forbidden Story of Monte Carlo (1924) as Krantz
 Beau Brummel (1924) as Lord Byron
 His Hour (1924)
 Beauty and the Bad Man (1925) as L.I.B. Bell
 Confessions of a Queen (1925) as Lewin
 Are Parents People? (1925) as Maurice Mansfield
 The Man in Blue (1925) as Carlo Guido
 Grounds for Divorce (1925) as Guido
 A Woman's Faith (1925) as Leandre Turcott
 The Big Parade (1925) as Minor Role (uncredited)
 The Grand Duchess and the Waiter (1926) as The Grand Duke Paul
 Miss Brewster's Millions (1926) as Mr. Brent
 The Bat (1926) as Gideon Bell
 So This Is Paris (1926) as Maurice Lalle
 Fig Leaves (1926) as Josef André
 The Eagle of the Sea (1926) as John Jarvis
 The Lady of the Harem (1926) as Selim
 The Popular Sin (1926) as Alphonse Martin
 Paradise for Two (1927) as Maurice
 Altars of Desire (1927) as Count André D'Orville
 The Small Bachelor (1927) as Finch
 If I Were Single (1927) as Claude
 Powder My Back (1928) as Claude
 Five and Ten Cent Annie (1928) as Orchestra Leader
 Beware of Bachelors (1928) as Claude de Brie
 Stark Mad (1929) as Simpson – Guide
 Strange Cargo (1929) as First Stranger
 Glad Rag Doll (1929) as Barry (an actor)
 Darkened Rooms (1929) as Madame Silvara's Customer (uncredited)
 Lilies of the Field (1930) as Barber
 The Boudoir Diplomat (1930) as Potz
 Three Girls Lost (1931) as Andre (uncredited)
 Annabelle's Affairs (1931) as Archie
 The Age for Love (1931) as The Poet
 Surrender (1931) as Fichet
 Ladies of the Jury (1932) as Alonzo Beal (uncredited)
 Love Is a Racket (1932) as Manager of Elizabeth Morgan's (uncredited)
 Ex-Lady (1933) as Dinner Guest / Pianist (uncredited)
 Mama Loves Papa (1933) as Basil Pew
 Coming Out Party (1934) as Waiter at Aladdin's Lamp (uncredited)
 Jimmy the Gent (1934) as Steamship Ticket Clerk (uncredited)
 Hollywood Party (1934) as Durante's Barber (uncredited)
 Kiss and Make-Up (1934) as Valet
 Young and Beautiful (1934) as Henry Briand
 The Captain Hates the Sea (1934) as Jeweler (uncredited)
 Clive of India (1935) as Mr. St. Aubin (uncredited)
 One New York Night (1935) as Matthews (uncredited)
 Gold Diggers of 1935 (1935) as Head Waiter (uncredited)
 Once in a Blue Moon (1935) as Kolia
 The Flame Within (1935) as Prince Hassan (uncredited)
 Don't Bet on Blondes (1935) as Wedding Dress Fitter (uncredited)
 The Payoff (1935) as Reporter (uncredited)
 Ship Cafe (1935) as Tailor (uncredited)
 The Man Who Broke the Bank at Monte Carlo (1935) as Casino Assistant (uncredited)
 Stars Over Broadway (1935) as Man Wanting Testimonial (uncredited)
 Dangerous (1935) as First Waiter (uncredited)
 Anything Goes (1936) as Gaylord (uncredited)
 The Story of Louis Pasteur (1936) as Assistant (uncredited)
 The Walking Dead (1936) as Nolan's Butler (uncredited)
 Love Before Breakfast (1936) as Charles (uncredited)
 Colleen (1936) as Jeweler (uncredited)
 Snowed Under (1936) as Costume Designer Maza (uncredited)
 The Singing Kid (1936) as Designer (uncredited)
 Times Square Playboy (1936) as Jewelry Store Clerk (uncredited)
 Bullets or Ballots (1936) as Waiter (uncredited)
 Hearts Divided (1936) as Jefferson's Secretary (uncredited)
 The Big Noise (1936) as Mr. Rosewater
 Hot Money (1936) as Ed Biddle
 China Clipper (1936) as Waiter (uncredited)
 Love Begins at 20 (1936) as Eddie as Office Worker (uncredited)
 Walking on Air (1936) as Albert, the Valet (uncredited)
 Down the Stretch (1936) as William J. Cooper (uncredited)
 Cain and Mabel (1936) as Headwaiter (uncredited)
 Love on the Run (1936) as Comedy Reactionary (uncredited)
 King of Hockey (1936) as Evans, Kathleen's Chauffeur
 Stolen Holiday (1937) as Swiss Waiter (uncredited)
 Ready, Willing, and Able (1937) as Tenant (uncredited)
 Café Metropole (1937) as Hat Clerk
 San Quentin (1937) as Lorenz Review Headwaiter (uncredited)
 Dangerous Holiday (1937) (uncredited)
 Wake Up and Live (1937) as Accompanist (uncredited)
 Fight for Your Lady (1937) as Florist (uncredited)
 Hollywood Round-Up (1937) as Hotel Clerk
 I'll Take Romance (1937) as Male Dressmaker (uncredited)
 The Lone Wolf in Paris (1938) as Hotel Desk Manager (uncredited)
 Beauty for the Asking (1939) as Cyril
 He Stayed for Breakfast (1940) as Maitre d'hotel (uncredited)
 She Knew All the Answers (1941) as Head Waiter
 Two in a Taxi (1941) as Receptionist (uncredited)
 Our Wife (1941) as Waiter (uncredited)
 Over My Dead Body (1942) as Salesman
 Saratoga Trunk (1945) as Leon (uncredited)
 The Spider (1945) as Apartment Manager
 The Shocking Miss Pilgrim (1947) as Office Clerk (uncredited)
 Nightmare Alley (1947) as The Geek (uncredited)
 Cry of the City (1948) as Barber (uncredited)
 The Snake Pit (1948) as Bit Role (uncredited)
 Road House (1948) as Lefty
 Unfaithfully Yours (1948) as Maitre d' (uncredited)
 Chicken Every Sunday (1949) as Barker (uncredited)
 The Fan (1949) as Philippe's Assistant (uncredited)
 You're My Everything (1949) as Waiter (uncredited)
 Dancing in the Dark (1949) as Waiter (uncredited)
 Wabash Avenue (1950) as Wax Museum Attendant (uncredited)

References

Further reading

External links

 

1893 births
1973 deaths
20th-century Australian male actors
Australian male silent film actors
Australian film directors
Male actors from Sydney
Australian gay actors
Australian expatriate male actors in the United States
20th-century Australian LGBT people